The Audi Avus quattro was a concept sports car made by the German car manufacturer Audi.  It was first introduced at the 1991 Tokyo Motor Show. The Avus quattro had an aluminium space frame, which helped reduce weight. This second showing of the new aluminium architecture (after the quattro Spyder a month before) paved the way for the mass-produced aluminium A8 in 1994.

Design 
The bodywork on the Avus was designed by J Mays and inspired by Auto Union race cars of the 1930s, which featured unpainted aluminum bodies. The panels are made from polished 1.5 mm thick aluminum that was hand-beaten.

Specifications 
The Avus quattro's engine was supposed to be a 6.0 L 60-valve W12 engine producing . The car shown at the Tokyo Motor Show, however, was fitted with a precision painted dummy, crafted from wood and plastic. Reason being, that at the time, its intended powertrain was still in development; Audi-made W12 engines were not available to buyers until 2001, on the 2001 Audi A8 6.0 W12 quattro. The Avus also features three lockable differentials, rear-wheel steering and a NACA-style duct mounted on the roof.

The Avus quattro is now on display at Audi's museum mobile in Ingolstadt, Germany.

References

External links

 Audi Corporate website
 museum mobile, Ingolstadt 
 Audi Avus Quattro Info Page By 21st Century 
 Audi Avus quattro page on Audi Corporate Website 

Avus quattro
Sports cars
Rear mid-engine, all-wheel-drive vehicles